Fernando Fabricio Salas Manguis (born February 10, 1988) is an Ecuadorian male weightlifter, competing in the +105 kg category and representing Ecuador at international competitions. He participated in the men's +105 kg event at the 2015 World Weightlifting Championships, and at the 2016 Summer Olympics, finishing in fourteenth position. He won the bronze medal in the same weight category at the 2015 Pan American Games.

Major results

References

1988 births
Living people
Ecuadorian male weightlifters
Place of birth missing (living people)
Weightlifters at the 2016 Summer Olympics
Olympic weightlifters of Ecuador
Weightlifters at the 2015 Pan American Games
Pan American Games bronze medalists for Ecuador
Pan American Games medalists in weightlifting
Weightlifters at the 2019 Pan American Games
Medalists at the 2015 Pan American Games
21st-century Ecuadorian people